John Hughes (14 June 1903 – 20 February 1977) was a British architect. In 1932 he won a gold medal in the art competitions of the Olympic Games for his design of a "Sports and Recreation Centre with Stadium, for the City of Liverpool".

References

 
 
 
 

1903 births
1977 deaths
20th-century British architects
Olympic gold medalists in art competitions
Medalists at the 1932 Summer Olympics
Olympic competitors in art competitions